Musa Tchitchi Ndusha (born 12  August 1994 in Kinshasa) or known as Chichi Musa, is a Congolese  professional footballer who plays as a midfielder for Bukavu Dawa.

Playing history
Ndusha has  previously played in Renaissance in Congo, Simba S.C. in Tanzania, Buildcon F.C in Zambia, Slutsk in Belarus.

Simba S.C. 
In July 2016, Ndusha joined Simba S.C.  from Renaissance. However it took some long time without featuring for Simba S.C.  due to the claims which arose from Renaissance indicating that Ndusha was still contracted with them however  Simba S.C.  decided to open a FIFA trial, leaving the scenes to show the player has no contract with the  Renaissance  at the end FIFA allowed him to play for Simba S.C. He made his debut  for  Simba S.C. on 8 August 2016 against AFC Leopards in a friendly match played in National Stadium Dar es Salaam, Simba S.C. won 4-0 . In December 2016, Simba S.C. released Ndusha.

Buildcon F.C 
In 2017, Ndusha joined Buildcon F.C. On 29 March 2017, Ndusha made his debut for Buildcon F.C against TP Mazembe. The match ended 0-0.

Slutsk
He joined Slutsk in 2018 and making his debut against FC Gomel  on 31 March 2018 at  Stadyen im. Alexander Prokopenko (Babruysk (Bobruisk))

References

External links 
 

1994 births
Living people
Democratic Republic of the Congo footballers
Association football midfielders
Democratic Republic of the Congo expatriate footballers
Expatriate footballers in Tanzania
Expatriate footballers in Zambia
Expatriate footballers in Belarus
Simba S.C. players
FC Slutsk players
FC Renaissance du Congo players
Democratic Republic of the Congo expatriate sportspeople in Tanzania
Buildcon F.C. players
Tanzanian Premier League players